Paul Andrew Mattison (born 24 April 1973) was an English footballer who played as a midfielder for Darlington in The Football League.

References

External links
Paul Mattison Soccerbase

1973 births
Living people
English footballers
Association football midfielders
Darlington F.C. players
North Ferriby United A.F.C. players
Guiseley A.F.C. players
Farsley Celtic A.F.C. players
English Football League players
Glasshoughton Welfare A.F.C. players